That Man George is a 1966 French crime film starring George Hamilton and Claudine Auger. It was written and directed by Jacques Deray.

It was also known as The Man from Marrakesh.

Plot

Cast 
 George Hamilton as George
 Claudine Auger as Lila
 Alberto de Mendoza as Travis
 Tiberio Murgia as José
 Daniel Ivernel as Vibert
 Renato Baldini		
 Roberto Camardiel	
 Giacomo Furia		
 George Rigaud

References

External links
 

1966 films
1966 crime films
1960s heist films
French crime films
French heist films
Films based on American novels
Films directed by Jacques Deray
Films with screenplays by José Giovanni
Films set in Morocco
Films shot in Almería
1960s French films